Locust Hill is an unincorporated community in Prince William County, Virginia, United States.

References

Unincorporated communities in Prince William County, Virginia
Washington metropolitan area
Unincorporated communities in Virginia